Salif may refer to:

Places
As-Salif, coastal village in western Yemen
As Salif District, district of Al Hudaydah Governorate, Yemen

Persons
Music
Salif (rapper), French rapper

Politics
Salif Diallo (born 1957), Burkinabé politician

Sports
Salif Cissé (footballer, born 1992), French football player
Salif Cissé (footballer, born 1994), German football player 
Salif Coulibaly (born 1988), Malian football player
Salif Dianda (born 1987), Burkinabé football player 
Salif Diao (born 1977), Senegalese football player 
Salif Diao (Dutch footballer) (born 1990), Dutch footballer
Salif Keita (born 1949), Malian afro-pop singer-songwriter
Salif Keïta (Malian footballer) (born 1946), Malian football player
Salif Keita (Senegalese footballer) (born 1975), Senegalese football player
Salif Kéïta (Central African footballer) (born 1990), Central African Republican football player
Salif Nogo (born 1986), Burkina Faso-French football player
Salif Sané (born 1990), French football player of Senegalese origin

Others
Centre Salif Keita a.k.a. CSK, Malian football club based in Bamako
Stade Centre Salif Keita, sports stadium in Bamako, Mali
Juicy Salif, lemon squeezer designed by Philippe Starck